

The Great American Rail-Trail is a cross-country rail trail in the United States. The trail will run  between Washington D.C. in the east and the state of Washington in the west. The planned trail is already more than 53% complete, with over 2,000 completed miles on the ground. The trail runs through 12 states and the District of Columbia, and will be within  of 50 million Americans. The work is being facilitated by Rails-to-Trails Conservancy. The Great American Rail-Trail is composed of over 150 existing multi-use trails with about 90 gaps to be filled. The project was launched in May 2019.

Route
The trail overlaps several long distance rail trails for part or all of their route.  From west to east, they include:
Olympic Discovery Trail, Washington
Palouse to Cascades State Park Trail, Washington
Trail of the Coeur d'Alenes, Idaho
Olympian Trail, Montana
Headwaters Trail System, Montana
Casper Rail Trail, Wyoming
Cowboy Trail, Nebraska
Cedar Valley Trail, Iowa
Hennepin Canal Parkway State Park, Illinois
Illinois and Michigan Canal Trail, Illinois
Nickel Plate Trail, Indiana
Cardinal Greenway, Indiana
Little Miami Scenic Trail, Ohio
Ohio to Erie Trail, Ohio
Panhandle Trail, West Virginia
Great Allegheny Passage, Pennsylvania and Maryland
C&O Towpath Trail, Maryland
Capital Crescent Trail, Maryland and D.C.

See also

 Rail trail
 Trail
 Long-distance trail
 EuroVelo
 List of long-distance trails
 Long-distance trails in the United States
 List of rail trails
 State wildlife trails (United States)
 List of longest cross-country trails
 East Coast Greenway
 Empire State Trail
 Katy Trail State Park

References

Notes

Citations

General references

External links
 Great American Rail-Trail, official site.

National Trails of the United States
Trails
Hiking trails in the United States
Rail trails in Ohio